Sekolah Pelita Harapan (SPH) is a group of five private Christian international schools located around Greater Jakarta, Indonesia. 

SPH has five campuses in Lippo Village, Tangerang for Early Childhood to Grade 12, Sentul City, Bogor for Pre-Kindergarten to Grade 12, Lippo Cikarang for Early Childhood to Grade 12, Kemang Village, South Jakarta for Early Childhood to Grade 12, and Pluit Village for Early Childhood to Grade 10.

History 
In 1993, SPH was founded by billionaires Johannes Oentoro and Dr. James T. Riady, the Lippo Village campus was the first SPH campus followed by campuses in Sentul City in 1994 and Lippo Cikarang in 1995. Kemang Village and Pluit Village campuses opened in 2011 and 2014 respectively.

Notable alumni 
Agnes Monica - known as Agnez Mo, Indonesian singer
Claudia Natasia - Author
NIKI - Indonesian singer

Controversies 
In 2018, the school's founder, James Riady, who was earlier indicted by the federal government of the United States for campaign finance violations to the Democratic Party, was charged by the Indonesian government for a corruption scandal worth nearly $21 billion.

References

External links 
 

Schools in Jakarta
Christian schools in Indonesia
Educational institutions established in 1993
1993 establishments in Indonesia